The women's 400 metres at the 2022 World Athletics Championships was held at the Hayward Field in Eugene, Oregon, U.S. from 17 to 22 July 2022.

Summary

In the absence of defending champion, #3 all time Salwa Eid Naser due to a succession of missed drug tests, #7 and double Olympic champion Shaunae Miller-Uibo  and Marileidy Paulino were among the handful of athletes who had broken 50 seconds in 2022.  Those two were the only ones to achieve the feat in the semis, though all auto qualifiers were under 50.2.

Adorned with green hair, Miller-Uibo quickly shortened the stagger between herself and Fiordaliza Cofil and then Candice McLeod to her outside.  On the far outside, Lieke Klaver, Sada Williams and Paulino were doing the best to hold their position against Miller-Uibo.  Williams accelerated slightly through the final turn, coming off in second place, slightly ahead of Paulino.  The final 100m is Paulino's territory.  Se separated from Williams but was unable to make up any ground on Miller-Uibo.

Miller-Uibo's 49.11 became the new world leader for the year.  Williams became the first female medalist for Barbados, improving on her own National Record.

Records
Before the competition records were as follows:

Qualification standard
The standard to qualify automatically for entry was 51.35.

Schedule
The event schedule, in local time (UTC−7), was as follows:

Results

Heats 
The first 3 athletes in each heat (Q) and the next 6 fastest (q) qualify for the heats.

Semi-finals 

The semifinals started on 20 July at 18:45.

Final

References

400
400 metres at the World Athletics Championships